Germanicopolis was an ancient town in Bithynia, also known as Caesarea in Bythinia (not to be confused with Caesarea Germanica, as such a former bishopric and present Latin Catholic titular see.

History 
It was located on the Gelbes river, not far from Prusa (modern Bursa in Turkey). In earlier times it was called Helge, Helgas or Booscoete, Plin. v. 40. Modern scholars locate the town at the village of Tahtalı

The city was taken by the Ottoman Empire in 1326 and the new Ottoman capital city was built at nearby Bursa (the Ancient Prusa).

Ecclesiastical history 
In Byzantine times the town was the see of a suffragan of the Archdiocese of Nicomedia, in the sway of the Patriarchate of Constantinople.

The names of a number of bishops are historically documented: 
 Phileas, mentioned in the martyr vita of Saint Tirsus and companions under Roman emperor Diocletian. 
 Rufus, attending the First Council of Nicaea
 Paul(us), partook in the minor Council of Constantinople of 518
 Johannes, attended the Council of Constantinople convoked by Patriarch Mennas of Constantinople in 536
 Theodosius quarrelled with Maximus the Confessor
 Theodorus, partook in the Third Council of Constantinople 
 Constantinus, attending the Second Council of Nicaea 
 Theophilus, partook in the Council of Constantinople of 879-880 which rehabilitated Photius as Patriarch of Constantinople

Titular see 
The diocese was nominally restored in 1933 as Latin Titular bishopric of Cesarea in Bithynia (Latin) / Cesarea di Bitinia (Curiate Italian) / Cæsarien(sis) in Bithynia (Latin adjective).

It is vacant since decades, having had the following incumbents, so far of the fitting Episcopal (lowest) rank :
 Anthony Jeremiah Pesce, Passionist (C.P.) (born Italy) (1951.05.10 – 1953.03.25) as last Apostolic Vicar of Dodoma (Tanzania) (1951.05.10 – 1953.03.25); next (see) promoted first Bishop of Dodoma (Tanzania) (1953.03.25 – death 1971.12.20)
 Giovanni Sismondo (1954.09.30 – 1955.02.21) (Italian), on emeritate : previously Bishop of Pontremoli (Italy) (1930.02.06 – 1954.09.30); later (promoted) Titular Archbishop of Marcianopolis (1955.02.21 – death 1957.12.07)
 Secondo Chiocca (1955.04.15 – death 1982.01.05) first as Auxiliary Bishop of Archdiocese of Genova (Genua, Italy) (1955.04.15 – retired 1981.05.09), then as emeritate; previously Bishop of Roman Catholic Diocese of Foligno (Italy) (1947.01.18 – resigned 1955.04.15).

References

Sources and external links 
 GCatholic - (former and) titular bishopric
 
 Pius Bonifacius Gams, Series episcoporum Ecclesiae Catholicae, Leipzig 1931, p. 443
 
 Raymond Janin, lemma 'Césarée de Bithynie', in Dictionnaire d'Histoire et de Géographie ecclésiastiques, vol. XII, Paris 1953, col. 199

Roman towns and cities in Turkey
Roman Bithynia
Former populated places in Turkey
Geography of Bursa Province
Populated places in Bithynia